Yue Xia Wang Fridén, born November 13, 1962 in Jiujiang, China, is a Swedish-Chinese table tennis player. Wang Fridén won the Swedish Championship for ladies in team 1998 with Norrköping's BTK. She has also received another 26 gold, one World Cup silver, two World Cup bronze, two European Championship silver and three gold in the Nordic Championship in the veteran class. Wang Fridén is famous for her difficult serving with screw variation as well as speed.

References 

Living people
1962 births
Chinese female table tennis players
Swedish female table tennis players
Chinese emigrants to Sweden
People from Jiujiang